Ab Lench  is a village in Worcestershire, England.

History

Ab Lench was recorded in the Domesday Book of 1086.

Ab Lench was classed as a civil parish from 1866 to 1933 when it was merged with Church Lench. This fell to 41 in 1901 and just 31 in 1921. The population had increased again to 57 by 1931, shortly before the parish was merged. The village has also been known as "Abbots Lench", as recorded in the 1911 census, and "Hob Lench" as noted by the Royal Historical Society in 1991.

References

External links 

Villages in Worcestershire